Aulus Manlius Vulso may refer to:

 Aulus Manlius Vulso (consul 178 BC)
 Aulus Manlius Vulso (decemvir)
 Aulus Manlius Vulso Capitolinus

See also